Midway is a census-designated place and an unincorporated area in Seminole County, Florida, United States. The population was 1,714 at the 2000 census. It is part of the Orlando–Kissimmee–Sanford Metropolitan Statistical Area.

Geography

According to the United States Census Bureau, the CDP has a total area of 3.6 km (1.4 mi2), all land.

Demographics
As of the census of 2000, there were 1,714 people, 583 households, and 412 families residing in the CDP.  The population density was 476.1/km (1,232.0/mi2).  There were 625 housing units at an average density of 173.6/km (449.3/mi2).  The racial makeup of the CDP was 3.85% White, 93.58% African American, 0.06% Native American, 0.58% Asian, 0.76% from other races, and 1.17% from two or more races. Hispanic or Latino of any race were 1.11% of the population.

There were 583 households, out of which 27.8% had children under the age of 18 living with them, 31.6% were married couples living together, 31.7% had a female householder with no husband present, and 29.2% were non-families. 24.4% of all households were made up of individuals, and 11.1% had someone living alone who was 65 years of age or older.  The average household size was 2.94 and the average family size was 3.52.

In the CDP, the population was spread out, with 30.0% under the age of 18, 9.2% from 18 to 24, 25.3% from 25 to 44, 21.6% from 45 to 64, and 13.8% who were 65 years of age or older.  The median age was 34 years. For every 100 females, there were 84.9 males.  For every 100 females age 18 and over, there were 78.3 males.

The median income for a household in the CDP was $25,406, and the median income for a family was $27,243. Males had a median income of $23,281 versus $18,902 for females. The per capita income for the CDP was $11,800.  About 22.0% of families and 26.0% of the population were below the poverty line, including 39.2% of those under age 18 and 7.0% of those age 65 or over.

References

External links
 Seminole County Convention and Visitors Bureau

Census-designated places in Seminole County, Florida
Greater Orlando
Census-designated places in Florida